Bodheswaran (28 December 1901 – 3 July 1990), (also known as Bodheswarananda), was an Indian independence activist, social reformer and a poet of Malayalam literature. He was known for his nationalistic poems such as Keralaganam and for his involvement in social movements like Vaikom Satyagraha and other related events which led to the Temple Entry Proclamation of 1936.

Biography 
Bodheswaran, né Keshava Pillai, was born on 28 December 1901 in Neyyattinkara, in Travancore (in the present day Thiruvananthapuram, Kerala, India) to Champayil Veettil Kunjan Pillai and Thazhamangalam Janaki Pillai.

Influenced by the thoughts of Swami Vivekananda from an early age, he left his studies to visit the social and religious reformer Narayana Guru with whom he stayed for about two years. Subsequently, he travelled throughout India and during a visit to the Kashi Vishwanath Temple, he assumed the name of Bodheswarananda. It was during these travels, he met several Sannyasins and Indian independence activists; he also had the opportunity to attend the public meetings of Mahatma Gandhi and Motilal Nehru.

Bodheswaran was married to V. K. Karthiyayini Amma, a professor of Sanskrit in the Government Sanskrit College, Thiruvananthapuram. The couple had three daughters,  Hridayakumari, Sugathakumari and Sujatha, all the three being writers. He died on 3 July 1990, at the age of 88.

With Chattampi Swamikal and Narayana Guru
On his return to Kerala, Bodheswaran was advised by Narayana Guru to meet Chattampi Swamikal, who was known to have been a major influence in his life. Thereafter, he kept his association with Swamikal, while getting involved the Indian freedom struggle and made several public speeches which were saide to have attracted large crowds. After a short spell during which he favoured the Arya Samaj movement, he got involved in the Vaikom Satyagraha and other related events until the Temple Entry Proclamation of 1936. He also became a member of the Indian National Congress and changed his name once more, to Bodheswaran.

After Indian independence Bodheswaran gradually withdrew from active politics, although he remained a Congressman until his death. He lectured and wrote on the subject of Swamikal, his belief as quoted by Nair and Devi is that Swamikal was "an embodiment of perfect knowledge".

Legacy and honours 
Bodheswaran was known for his poems reflecting nationalistic fervour during his involvement in the Indian independence movement which included Keralaganam, a popular patriotic song of the times. He published six books which, besides poetry anthologies, include a compilation of his speeches. He attempted to write a comprehensive world history covering the period up to World War I but could not complete it. Suprabhatham, a magazine he founded, also had only a short life.

The Government of India honoured him with the Thamra Patra (Copper Plaque) for his contributions to the Indian independence movement. His birth centenary was celebrated in 2002 when K. R. Narayanan, the then president of India, inaugurated Bodheshwaran Foundation, an eponymous organization, for propagating his ideals. Keralaganam, his patriotic song, was declared as the cultural song of Kerala in 2014.

Bibliography

See also 

 List of Malayalam-language authors by category
 List of Malayalam-language authors

References

Further reading

External links

 
 
 

Hindu revivalists
People from Thiruvananthapuram district
Poets from Kerala
Malayali people
1990 deaths
1901 births
20th-century Indian poets
Gandhians
Indian independence activists from Kerala
Indian reformers
Indian male writers